= Shlom Native Eating House =

Building in Johannesburg, South Africa

- Interactive map of the Shlom Native Eating House area

General information
- Status: Completed
- Location: Johannesburg, South Africa
- Completed: 1914

Height
- Roof: 102 metres (335 ft)

Design and construction
- Architects: AH & Walter Reid

The Shlom Native Eating House was constructed in 1914 as an eatery for African natives who were involved in trading. The house operated under segregation policies to divide whites from blacks. It is the only remaining example of its type in Johannesburg. Most eating houses catered for mine workers and poorest no mining urban Africans. The Shlom was a symbol of success for the African native, it catered for the black middle class.
